Nélida Sulca (born 10 July 1987) is a Peruvian long-distance runner. She competed in the senior women's race at the 2019 IAAF World Cross Country Championships held in Aarhus, Denmark. She finished in 71st place.

In 2017, she competed in the senior women's race at the IAAF World Cross Country Championships held in Kampala, Uganda. She finished in 60th place.

References

External links 
 

Living people
1987 births
Place of birth missing (living people)
Peruvian female long-distance runners
Peruvian female cross country runners
20th-century Peruvian women
21st-century Peruvian women